Essendon railway station is located on the Craigieburn line in Victoria, Australia. It serves the northern Melbourne suburb of Essendon, and it opened on 1 November 1860.

History
Essendon station opened on 1 November 1860, as the terminus of the private Melbourne and Essendon Railway Company line. The station closed with the line on 1 July 1864, but was reopened on 9 October 1871, under government ownership. The line to the north was opened in 1872, as part of the North East line to School House Lane. Like the suburb itself, the station was named after Essendon in Hertfordshire, England.

In 1878, a completely new station, with a single platform, was provided, on the site of the present island platform, with passenger subways and footbridges added in 1886, along with conversion of the island platform to the current layout. It was also at that time that a rail overpass was provided at Mount Alexander Road, in what was one of the first grade separation projects to be carried out in the state. In 1909, the present buildings were provided, along with a centre track between Platforms 1 and 2.

In 1919, electric train services between the city and Essendon were inaugurated, with electrification extended to Broadmeadows in 1921. However, Essendon remained the terminus of most suburban services, with a shuttle service operating beyond until 1925, and all-day through services to Broadmeadows not provided until 1941.

In 1965, the double line block signalling between Broadmeadows and Essendon was abolished, and was replaced with three position signalling. In 1969, the station took the layout it has today, with the abolition of the centre track, the closure of the stand-alone signal box, the provision of automatic signalling along the line, and the replacement of the interlocked gates with boom barriers at the former Buckley Street level crossing. A signal panel was provided within the station office in that same year. 

On 7 March 1974, Harris motor 518M and Tait motor 368M were destroyed by fire whilst stabled at the station. Tait trailer 85G was also damaged in the fire.

On 8 June 1987, stabling of suburban trains at Essendon ceased, with the overhead wiring of all sidings removed just over a year later. On 1 September 1988, the former sidings near Rose Street were removed.

On 16 August 1996, Essendon was upgraded to a Premium Station. Also in that year, siding "B" was taken out of service. On 7 June 2014, the signal panel was abolished.

On 20 September 2016, the Victorian State Government announced the grade separation of the Buckley Street level crossing. Construction began in 2018, with the level crossing removed and Buckley Street reopening on 28 September of that year. Buckley Street now runs under the railway line in a trench.

As part of the Melbourne Metro Rail Tunnel, it is expected that the turnback facilities at the station will be upgraded, to allow services to start at Essendon when the tunnel opens in 2025.

Platforms and services
Essendon has one island platform with two faces and one side platform. Platform 1 is only used by V/Line services to overtake Metro Trains' services, or when three-car trains are terminating, as it is unable to accommodate a six-car train.

The station is served by Craigieburn line trains and some V/Line Seymour line services.

Platform 1:
 Passing loop only for V/Line services and three-car passenger services during major disruptions.

Platform 2:
  all stations services to Flinders Street
  three weekday morning peak hour V/Line services to Southern Cross (set down only)
  one weekday morning peak hour V/Line service to Southern Cross (set down only)

Platform 3:
  all stations services to Craigieburn
  four weekday evening peak hour V/Line services to Seymour (pick up only)
  one weekday evening peak hour V/Line service to Shepparton (pick up only)

Transport links
CDC Melbourne operates one bus route via Essendon station, under contract to Public Transport Victoria:
 : Moonee Ponds Junction – Broadmeadows station

Kastoria Bus Lines operates three bus routes via Essendon station, under contract to Public Transport Victoria:
 : Moonee Ponds Junction – Keilor East
 : Watergardens station – Moonee Ponds Junction

Kinetic Melbourne operates one SmartBus route via Essendon station, under contract to Public Transport Victoria:
  : Altona station – Mordialloc

Moonee Valley Coaches operates one bus route to and from Essendon station, under contract to Public Transport Victoria:
 : to Brunswick East

Moreland Buslines operates one bus route to and from Essendon station, under contract to Public Transport Victoria:
 : to Ivanhoe station

Ryan Brothers Bus Service operates two bus routes to and from Essendon station, under contract to Public Transport Victoria:
 : to Keilor Park
 : to Highpoint Shopping Centre

Sunbury Bus Service operates one bus route via Essendon station, under contract to Public Transport Victoria:
 : Sunbury station – Moonee Ponds Junction

Ventura Bus Lines operates one bus route via Essendon station, under contract to Public Transport Victoria:
  : Melbourne CBD (Queen Street) – Broadmeadows station (Saturday and Sunday mornings only)

Yarra Trams operates one route via Essendon station:
 : Airport West – Flinders Street station (Elizabeth Street Melbourne CBD)

Gallery

References

External links

 Melway map at street-directory.com.au

Essendon, Victoria
Federation style architecture
Heritage-listed buildings in Melbourne
Listed railway stations in Australia
Premium Melbourne railway stations
Railway stations in Australia opened in 1860
Railway stations in Melbourne
Railway stations in the City of Moonee Valley